Ahmad Fahmi bin Mohamed Fadzil (born 4 February 1981) is a Malaysian politician who has served as Minister of Communications and Digital in the Pakatan Harapan (PH) administration under Prime Minister Anwar Ibrahim since December 2022 and the Member of Parliament (MP) for Lembah Pantai since May 2018. He is a member of the People's Justice Party (PKR), a component party of the PH coalition. He has also served as Information Chief of PKR since July 2022 and served as Communications Director of PKR from September 2013 to July 2022.

Education 
Fahmi has a bachelor's degree in Chemical Engineering (BSChE) from Purdue University, Indiana, USA.

Career 
Prior to formally joining PKR in 2010, Fahmi was a writer, actor and an award-winning theatre performer, and has appeared in shows such as the 2006 TV series Gol & Gincu (Goalpost and Lipsticks) and interview program The Fairly Current Show. He was also actively involved in social activism one which was being part of the Taman Medan Community Arts Project in 2012 which was about addressing racial tensions among young people through performing and visual arts. He was also graceful enough to act as a panellist in the Anti-Cyberbully Awareness Forum, a forum organised by the Universiti Malaya Student Union (UMSU) in Universiti Malaya on 7 January 2023.

Election results

References

External links

 

Living people
1981 births
Malaysian people of Malay descent
Malaysian Muslims
Malaysian television personalities
Malaysian actor-politicians
Kuala Lumpur politicians
Members of the Dewan Rakyat
People's Justice Party (Malaysia) politicians
Purdue University College of Engineering alumni
21st-century Malaysian politicians